Kurşunlu Mosque and Complex is a 16th-century Ottoman mosque and its social complex in Odunpazarı district of Eskişehir, Turkey.

Mosque
The mosque and the complex were commissioned by the Ottoman vizier Çoban Mustafa Pasha, and were built between 1517 and 1525. Although the architect is unknown, it is believed that it was designed by Acem Ali, who was the head architect before Mimar Sinan (c. 1489/1490 – 1588). The mosque is named for its lead-covered dome. The mosque is a single-dome, quadratic-plan building having stone masonry walls. The inside of the dome is decorated with hand-carved figures. Marble columns and capitals support pointed-arches of the  narthex in the architectural style of the classical period. The narthex is topped with five domes. The column capitals are decorated with muqarnas  ornaments. To the mosque belong a shadirvan, a zawiya, a harem, an imaret, a mausoleum of Mevlevi Order sheikhs and two caravanserais.

Social complex
A building of social complex, having an inscription, is an annex to the mosque. It consists of seven sections. One of the sections is transformed into a market of arts in Eskişehir. Traditional Turkish arts handcrafted in the market, including primarily meerschaum craftsmanship, calligraphy, paper marbling, manuscript illumination, carpet weaving rugs and silver made crafts and embroidery, can be observed and art items can be acquired.

The Eskişehir Meerschaum Museum is situated inside the social complex across the art market. Access to the museum is free of charge. In the museum, handmade tobacco pipes made of meerschaum and  meerschaum pipes are on display.

References

Ottoman mosques in Turkey
1525 establishments in the Ottoman Empire
Religious buildings and structures completed in 1525
Buildings and structures in Eskişehir Province
Odunpazarı
Mosques in Eskişehir
16th-century mosques